Dialectica carcharota is a moth of the family Gracillariidae. It is known from South Africa, Ethiopia and Zimbabwe.

The larvae feed on Borago officinalis, Cynoglossum hochstetteri and Lithospermum species. They mine the leaves of their host plant. The mine has the form of an irregular, semi-transparent blotch-mine, usually occupying a whole leaf.

References

Carcharota
Moths described in 1912
Lepidoptera of South Africa
Lepidoptera of Ethiopia
Lepidoptera of Zimbabwe
Moths of Sub-Saharan Africa